Natacha may refer to:

 Natacha (comics), a Franco-Belgian comics series
 Natacha (novel), a children's book by Luis Pescetti
 Natacha (given name), people with the given name Natacha
Polikarpov R-Z nickname in the Spanish Republican Air Force